The Crewe–Liverpool line is a railway line in North West England that diverges from the West Coast Main Line at Weaver Junction  north of  and runs to  via  and Liverpool South Parkway.

History
The line was built in stages by the Liverpool and Manchester Railway, the St Helens and Runcorn Gap Railway and the London and North Western Railway during the mid-19th century. The route became part of the London, Midland and Scottish Railway in 1923, passing to the London Midland Region of British Railways in 1948.

Electrification
The line was electrified at 25 kV AC, using overhead wires under the BR 1955 Modernisation Plan. In 1959, preparations began at Liverpool Lime Street for the first stage of electrification of the West Coast Main Line. On 1 January 1962, electric services between Liverpool Lime Street and Crewe officially began.

Signalling 
Re-signalling work from Liverpool to Weaver Junction was underway in 2016. Signal control moved to the Manchester rail operating centre removing five local signal boxes. The signal improvements improved journey times on this section of track.

Services

References

Sources

Rail transport in Merseyside
Railway lines in North West England
London and North Western Railway